The 40th Saturn Awards, honoring the best in science fiction, fantasy and horror film and television in 2013, was held on June 26, 2014, in Burbank, California. The awards were presented by the Academy of Science Fiction, Fantasy and Horror Films. The nominations were announced February 25, 2014.

Overview
In the film categories, Gravity won five of its eight nominations, including Best Science Fiction Film, Best Director for Alfonso Cuarón, and Best Actress for Sandra Bullock. In the television categories, Breaking Bad and The Walking Dead each won three awards, respectively. Breaking Bad won Best Television Presentation and The Walking Dead won Best Syndicated/Cable Television Series.

Two new	categories were added this year, Best Comic-to-Film Motion Picture and Best Performance by a Younger Actor in a Television Series. Adaptations of comic-books were usually nominated in the fantasy or science fiction categories, while the Academy of Science Fiction, Fantasy and Horror Films was previously only rewarding young actors in motion pictures. The Saturn Award for Best Horror or Thriller Film was also split into two categories: Best Horror and Best Thriller. With Chandler Riggs's nomination for Best Performance by a Younger Actor in TV Series, The Walking Dead became the first series to be nominated in all six television acting categories of the Saturn Awards. Riggs went on to win the award.

Writer/producer Bryan Fuller received the Dan Curtis Legacy Award. Actor Malcolm McDowell received The Life Career Award. Special effects creator Greg Nicotero received The George Pal Memorial Award and author Marc Cushman received a Special Recognition Award for his recent Star Trek book publications.

Winners and nominees

Film

Television

Programs

Acting

Home video

Multiple awards and nominations

Film

Television

References

External links
 Official Saturn Awards website

Saturn Awards ceremonies
Saturn
2013 film awards
2013 television awards
Saturn